Below is the list of populated places in Erzincan Province, Turkey by the districts. In the following lists first place in each list is the administrative center of the district.

Erzincan

Erzincan
Ağılözü, Erzincan
Ahmetli, Erzincan
Akyazı, Erzincan
Aydoğdu, Erzincan
Bahçeliköy, Erzincan
Bahçeyazı, Erzincan
Balıbeyi, Erzincan
Ballı, Erzincan
Baltaşı, Erzincan
Beşsaray, Erzincan
Binkoç, Erzincan
Buğdaylı, Erzincan
Büyükçakırman, Erzincan
Caferli, Erzincan
Cevizli, Erzincan
Çağlayan, Erzincan
Çatalarmut, Erzincan
Çatalören, Erzincan
Çubuklu, Erzincan
Çukurkuyu, Erzincan
Davarlı, Erzincan
Demirkent, Erzincan
Dörtler, Erzincan
Ekinci, Erzincan
Ekmekli, Erzincan
Elmaköy, Erzincan
Ganiefendiçiftliği, Erzincan
Geçit, Erzincan
Gölpınar, Erzincan
Göyne, Erzincan
Güllüce, Erzincan
Gümüştarla, Erzincan
Günbağı, Erzincan
Günebakan, Erzincan
Gürlevik, Erzincan
Hacıalipalangası, Erzincan
Hancıçiftliği, Erzincan
Hanidere, Erzincan
Heybeli, Erzincan
Hürrempalangası, Erzincan
Ilıdere, Erzincan
Işıkpınar, Erzincan
Kalecik, Erzincan
Karadiğin, Erzincan
Karatuş, Erzincan
Kavakyolu, Erzincan
Keklikkayası, Erzincan
Kılıçkaya, Erzincan
Kilimli, Erzincan
Koçyatağı, Erzincan
Kurutilek, Erzincan
Küçükçakırman, Erzincan
Küçükkadağan, Erzincan
Mahmutlu, Erzincan
Mecidiye, Erzincan
Mertekli, Erzincan
Mollaköy, Erzincan
Oğlaktepe, Erzincan
Oğulcuk, Erzincan
Pekmezli, Erzincan
Pınarönü, Erzincan
Sazlıpınar, Erzincan
Saztepe, Erzincan
Soğukoluk, Erzincan
Söğütözü, Erzincan
Sütpınar, Erzincan
Tandırlı, Erzincan
Tatlısu, Erzincan
Türkmenoğlu, Erzincan
Ulalar, Erzincan
Uluköy, Erzincan
Yalınca, Erzincan
Yalnızbağ, Erzincan
Yaylabaşı, Erzincan
Yeniköy, Erzincan
Yeşilçat, Erzincan
Yeşilçay, Erzincan
Yoğurtlu, Erzincan

Çayırlı

Çayırlı
Aşağıçamurdere, Çayırlı
Aşağıkartallı, Çayırlı
Balıklı, Çayırlı
Başköy, Çayırlı
Boybeyi, Çayırlı
Bozağa, Çayırlı
Bölükova, Çayırlı
Büyükgelengeç, Çayırlı
Büyükyaylaköy, Çayırlı
Cennetpınar, Çayırlı
Çataksu, Çayırlı
Çaykent, Çayırlı
Çayönü, Çayırlı
Çilhoroz, Çayırlı
Çilligöl, Çayırlı
Doğanyuva, Çayırlı
Doluca, Çayırlı
Esendoruk, Çayırlı
Eşmepınar, Çayırlı
Gelinpınar, Çayırlı
Göller, Çayırlı
Harmantepe, Çayırlı
Hastarla, Çayırlı
Karataş, Çayırlı
Küçükgelengeç, Çayırlı
Mazlumağa, Çayırlı
Mirzaoğlu, Çayırlı
Oğultaşı, Çayırlı
Ortaçat, Çayırlı
Ozanlı, Çayırlı
Paşayurdu, Çayırlı
Pınarlı, Çayırlı
Saraycık, Çayırlı
Sarıgüney, Çayırlı
Saygılı, Çayırlı
Sırataş, Çayırlı
Toprakkale, Çayırlı
Tosunlar, Çayırlı
Turnaçayırı, Çayırlı
Verimli, Çayırlı
Yaylakent, Çayırlı
Yaylalar, Çayırlı
Yazıkaya, Çayırlı
Yeşilyaka, Çayırlı
Yukarıçamurdere, Çayırlı
Yukarıkartallı, Çayırlı
Yürekli, Çayırlı

İliç

 İliç
Ağıldere, İliç
Akçayazı, İliç
Akdoğu, İliç
Altıntaş, İliç
Atma, İliç
Bağcuğaz, İliç
Bağıştaş, İliç
Bağlıca, İliç
Balkaya, İliç
Boyalık, İliç
Bozçalı, İliç
Bozyayla, İliç
Bürüncek, İliç
Büyükarmutlu, İliç
Büyükgümüşlü, İliç
Büyükköy, İliç
Çaltı, İliç
Çaylı, İliç
Çayyaka, İliç
Çiftlik, İliç
Çilesiz, İliç
Çobanlı, İliç
Çöpler, İliç
Çörekli, İliç
Dikmen, İliç
Doğan, İliç
Dolugün, İliç
Doruksaray, İliç
Dostal, İliç
Güngören, İliç
İslamköy, İliç
Kapıkaya, İliç
Karakaya, İliç
Kayacık, İliç
Kaymaklı, İliç
Konukçu, İliç
Kozluca, İliç
Kuran, İliç
Kuruçay, İliç
Kuzkışla, İliç
Küçükarmutlu, İliç
Küçükgümüşlü, İliç
Leventpınar, İliç
Ortatepe, İliç
Özlü, İliç
Sabırlı, İliç
Sarıkonak, İliç
Sarıpınar, İliç
Sularbaşı, İliç
Sütlüce, İliç
Tabanlı, İliç
Turgutlu, İliç
Uğur, İliç
Uluyamaç, İliç
Yakuplu, İliç
Yalıngöze, İliç
Yaylapınar, İliç
Yılmaz, İliç

Kemah

Kemah
Ağaçsaray, Kemah
Akbudak, Kemah
Akça, Kemah
Aktaş, Kemah
Akyünlü, Kemah
Alp, Kemah
Atma, Kemah
Ayranpınar, Kemah
Beşikli, Kemah
Boğaziçi, Kemah
Bozoğlak, Kemah
Cevizlik, Kemah
Çakırlar, Kemah
Çalgı, Kemah
Çalıklar, Kemah
Çamlıyayla, Kemah
Çiğdemli, Kemah
Dedek, Kemah
Dedeoğlu, Kemah
Dere, Kemah
Dikyamaç, Kemah
Doğan, Kemah
Doğanbeyli, Kemah
Doruca, Kemah
Dutlu, Kemah
Elmalı, Kemah
Eriç, Kemah
Esimli, Kemah
Eskibağlar, Kemah
Gediktepe, Kemah
Gökkaya, Kemah
Gölkaynak, Kemah
Gülbahçe, Kemah
Hakbilir, Kemah
Ilgarlı, Kemah
İncedere, Kemah
Karaca, Kemah
Karadağ, Kemah
Kardere, Kemah
Kayabaşı, Kemah
Kazankaya, Kemah
Kedek, Kemah
Kemeryaka, Kemah
Kerer, Kemah
Kırıkdere, Kemah
Koçkar, Kemah
Konuksever, Kemah
Koruyolu, Kemah
Kömür, Kemah
Kutluova, Kemah
Küplü, Kemah
Maksutuşağı, Kemah
Mermerli, Kemah
Mezra, Kemah
Muratboynu, Kemah
Oğuz, Kemah
Olukpınar, Kemah
Özdamar, Kemah
Parmakkaya, Kemah
Sarıyazı, Kemah
Seringöze, Kemah
Sürek, Kemah
Şahintepe, Kemah
Tan, Kemah
Tandırbaşı, Kemah
Taşbulak, Kemah
Tuzla, Kemah
Uluçınar, Kemah
Yağca, Kemah
Yahşılar, Kemah
Yardere, Kemah
Yastıktepe, Kemah
Yücebelen, Kemah

Kemaliye

 Kemaliye
Adak, Kemaliye
Ağıl, Kemaliye
Akçalı, Kemaliye
Aksöğüt, Kemaliye
Apçağa, Kemaliye
Armağan, Kemaliye
Arslanoba, Kemaliye
Aşağıumutlu, Kemaliye
Avcı, Kemaliye
Balkırı, Kemaliye
Başarı, Kemaliye
Başbağlar, Kemaliye
Başpınar, Kemaliye
Boylu, Kemaliye
Buğdaypınar, Kemaliye
Çakırtaş, Kemaliye
Çaldere, Kemaliye
Çanakçı, Kemaliye
Çat, Kemaliye
Çit, Kemaliye
Dallıca, Kemaliye
Demir, Kemaliye
Dilli, Kemaliye
Dolunay, Kemaliye
Dutluca, Kemaliye
Efeler, Kemaliye
Ergü, Kemaliye
Esence, Kemaliye
Esertepe, Kemaliye
Gözaydın, Kemaliye
Güldibi, Kemaliye
Gümüşçeşme, Kemaliye
Günyolu, Kemaliye
Harmankaya, Kemaliye
Kabataş, Kemaliye
Karakoçlu, Kemaliye
Karapınar, Kemaliye
Kavacık, Kemaliye
Kekikpınarı, Kemaliye
Kışlacık, Kemaliye
Kocaçimen, Kemaliye
Kozlupınar, Kemaliye
Kuşak, Kemaliye
Kutluca, Kemaliye
Ocak, Kemaliye
Salihli, Kemaliye
Sandık, Kemaliye
Sırakonak, Kemaliye
Subaşı, Kemaliye
Şahinler, Kemaliye
Topkapı, Kemaliye
Toybelen, Kemaliye
Tuğlu, Kemaliye
Yaka, Kemaliye
Yayladamı, Kemaliye
Yazmakaya, Kemaliye
Yeşilyamaç, Kemaliye
Yeşilyayla, Kemaliye
Yeşilyurt, Kemaliye
Yıldızlı, Kemaliye
Yukarıumutlu, Kemaliye
Yuva, Kemaliye

Otlukbeli

 Otlukbeli
 Ağamçağam, Otlukbeli
 Avcıçayırı, Otlukbeli
 Boğazlı, Otlukbeli
 Karadivan, Otlukbeli
 Küçükotlukbeli, Otlukbeli
 Ördekhacı, Otlukbeli
 Söğütlü, Otlukbeli
 Umurlu, Otlukbeli
 Yeniköy, Otlukbeli
 Yeşilbük, Otlukbeli

Refahiye

Refahiye
Ağmusa, Refahiye
Akarsu, Refahiye
Akbağ, Refahiye
Akçiğdem, Refahiye
Alacatlı, Refahiye
Alaçayır, Refahiye
Alapınar, Refahiye
Altköy, Refahiye
Ardıçlık, Refahiye
Armutlu, Refahiye
Arpayazı, Refahiye
Aslanyusuf, Refahiye
Aşağısütlü, Refahiye
Aşut, Refahiye
Avşarözü, Refahiye
Aydıncık, Refahiye
Aydoğan, Refahiye
Babaaslan, Refahiye
Bakacak, Refahiye
Baloğlu, Refahiye
Baştosun, Refahiye
Biçer, Refahiye
Bostandere, Refahiye
Bölüktepe, Refahiye
Cengerli, Refahiye
Çaltı, Refahiye
Çamdibi, Refahiye
Çamlımülk, Refahiye
Çat, Refahiye
Çatak, Refahiye
Çatalçam, Refahiye
Çavuş, Refahiye
Çıragediği, Refahiye
Çiçekali, Refahiye
Çukurçimen, Refahiye
Çukuryazı, Refahiye
Damlaca, Refahiye
Derebaşı, Refahiye
Diştaş, Refahiye
Diyarlar, Refahiye
Doğandere, Refahiye
Dolaylı, Refahiye
Ekecik, Refahiye
Erecek, Refahiye
Gazipınarı, Refahiye
Gemecik, Refahiye
Göçevi, Refahiye
Gökseki, Refahiye
Gölköy, Refahiye
Gülensu, Refahiye
Gümüşakar, Refahiye
Günyüzü, Refahiye
Güventepe, Refahiye
Güzle, Refahiye
Hacıköy, Refahiye
Halitler, Refahiye
Kabuller, Refahiye
Kaçak, Refahiye
Kadıköy, Refahiye
Kalkancı, Refahiye
Kamberağa, Refahiye
Kandil, Refahiye
Kanlıtaş, Refahiye
Karasu, Refahiye
Karayaprak, Refahiye
Kayı, Refahiye
Kazören, Refahiye
Keçegöz, Refahiye
Kersen, Refahiye
Kırantepe, Refahiye
Kırıktaş, Refahiye
Kırkbulak, Refahiye
Kızıleniş, Refahiye
Koçkaya, Refahiye
Konakköy, Refahiye
Kuzuluk, Refahiye
Kürelik, Refahiye
Laleli, Refahiye
Leventler, Refahiye
Madendere, Refahiye
Mendemebaşı, Refahiye
Mendemeköyçukuru, Refahiye
Merkez Kalkancı, Refahiye
Muratçayırı, Refahiye
Mülk, Refahiye
Olgunlar, Refahiye
Onurlu, Refahiye
Ortagöze, Refahiye
Ören, Refahiye
Perçem, Refahiye
Pınaryolu, Refahiye
Resullar, Refahiye
Sağlık, Refahiye
Salur, Refahiye
Sarhan, Refahiye
Sarıbayır, Refahiye
Sarıkoç, Refahiye
Sıralı, Refahiye
Söğütlü, Refahiye
Şahaloğlu, Refahiye
Şahverdi, Refahiye
Şaip, Refahiye
Teknecik, Refahiye
Tepe, Refahiye
Topağaç, Refahiye
Tuzluçayır, Refahiye
Tülü, Refahiye
Ulucak, Refahiye
Uludere, Refahiye
Üçören, Refahiye
Yaylabeli, Refahiye
Yaylapınarı, Refahiye
Yazı, Refahiye
Yazıgediği, Refahiye
Yeniköy, Refahiye
Yeniyurt, Refahiye
Yıldızören, Refahiye
Yukarısütlü, Refahiye
Yukarıyeniköy, Refahiye
Yurtbaşı, Refahiye
Yuvadağı, Refahiye

Tercan

Tercan
 Ağören, Tercan
 Aktaş, Tercan
 Akyurt, Tercan
 Altınkaya, Tercan
 Armutluk, Tercan
 Bağpınar, Tercan
 Balyayla, Tercan
 Başbudak, Tercan
 Beğendik, Tercan
 Beşgöze, Tercan
 Beşkaya, Tercan
 Beykonak, Tercan
 Bulmuş, Tercan
 Büklümdere, Tercan
 Çadırkaya, Tercan
 Çatakdere, Tercan
 Çayırdüzü, Tercan
 Çukuryurt, Tercan
 Dallıca, Tercan
 Darıtepe, Tercan
 Doluca, Tercan
 Edebük, Tercan
 Elaldı, Tercan
 Esenevler, Tercan
 Fındıklı, Tercan
 Gafurefendi, Tercan
 Gedikdere, Tercan
 Gevenlik, Tercan
 Gökçe, Tercan
 Gökpınar, Tercan
 Göktaş, Tercan
 Güzbulak, Tercan
 Hacıbayram, Tercan
 Ilısu, Tercan
 İkizler, Tercan
 Kalecik, Tercan
 Karacakışlak, Tercan
 Karacaören, Tercan
 Karahüseyin, Tercan
 Kargın, Tercan
 Kavaklık, Tercan
 Kemerçam, Tercan
 Kızılca, Tercan
 Konarlı, Tercan
 Köprübaşı, Tercan
 Kurukol, Tercan
 Kuzören, Tercan
 Küçükağa, Tercan
 Küllüce, Tercan
 Mantarlı, Tercan
 Mercan, Tercan
 Mustafabey, Tercan
 Müftüoğlu, Tercan
 Oğulveren, Tercan
 Ortaköy, Tercan
 Sağlıca, Tercan
 Sarıkaya, Tercan
 Sucuali, Tercan
 Şengül, Tercan
 Tepebaşı, Tercan
 Topalhasan, Tercan
 Üçpınar, Tercan
 Yalınkaş, Tercan
 Yastıkköy, Tercan
 Yaylacık, Tercan
 Yaylayolu, Tercan
 Yaylım, Tercan
 Yazıören, Tercan
 Yenibucak, Tercan
 Yeşilyayla, Tercan
 Yuvalı, Tercan

Üzümlü

Üzümlü
Altınbaşak, Üzümlü
Avcılar, Üzümlü
Bağlar, Üzümlü
Balabanlı, Üzümlü
Bayırbağ, Üzümlü
Bulanık, Üzümlü
Büyükköy, Üzümlü
Çadırtepe, Üzümlü
Çamlıca, Üzümlü
Çardaklı, Üzümlü
Çayıryazı, Üzümlü
Demirpınar, Üzümlü
Denizdamı, Üzümlü
Derebük, Üzümlü
Esenyurt, Üzümlü
Göller, Üzümlü
Karacalar, Üzümlü
Karakaya, Üzümlü
Kureyşlisarıkaya, Üzümlü
Ocakbaşı, Üzümlü
Otluk, Üzümlü
Pelitli, Üzümlü
Pınarlıkaya, Üzümlü
Pişkidağ, Üzümlü
Sansa, Üzümlü

References

Erzincan
List